Tuğba Yurt (born 2 September 1987) is a Turkish singer.

Early life 
Yurt was born in Belgium, due to her father's work there, but her family returned to Gemlik in the Bursa Province when she was only eight months old. She studied at the Bursa Uludağ University.

Career 
On 30 April 2014, a revised version of the song "Sakin Ol" was released with Yurt as the singer and Doğukan Manço serving as the composer and arranger. It was originally released in 1994 by Sertab Erener and was written and composed by Sezen Aksu and Uzay Hepari. The new music video was directed by Kemal Başbuğ and Ahmet Kural, Murat Cemcir other actors from the movie Kardeş Payı were featured in the video which was watched more than 120 million times on YouTube, becoming one of the most viewed video clips in Turkey in 2014. Later that year on 2 September, Yurt released a new music video for the song "Aşk Sanmışız" which was written and composed by Gökhan Özen. In summer 2015, on 27 May, she released her new song "Oh Oh" under the label DMC. It was written and composed by Sezen Aksu. Serkan Balkan arranged the single, while David Şaboy created the remix version. The shooting of the music video was done by Mustafa Özen on the platoon inside the Beykoz Kundura Factory. A cast member of 85 people accompanied Yurt during the shooting. In 2015, her new singe "Aklımda Sorular Var" was produced and published by DMC. Osman Hekimoğlu wrote the song and Ender Çabuker served as its composer. Murad Küçük directed the music video for"Aklımda Sorular Var" which was shot at the Atatürk Arboretum. Later that year, Yurt released another single titled "Güç Bende Artık". It was written by Onurr and Alper Narman and Murat Joker directed its music video. In March 2017, her new single "Destur", written by Deniz Erten and composed by Toylan Kaya, was released. Yurt then continued her career with the singles "İnceden İnceden" (2017), "Yine Sev Yine" (2018), and "Masal" (2018), before releasing her first studio album, Sığınak, in November 2019.

Personal life 
Yurt was in a relationship with the footballer, Cenk Şahin, until January 2020.

Discography 
Albums

EPs

Singles

 Music videos

References

External links 

 

Living people
1987 births
Turkish pop singers
Bursa Uludağ University alumni
21st-century Turkish singers
21st-century Turkish women singers